Badri Asadi  (born 3 November 1966) is a Taekwondo practitioner and member of national team in Iran.
At the first presence of women Team in the World championships in Turkey (2008) Asadi received first world individual women silver medal from Iran in this competition, she received second place in the world championships in Egypt 2009 as well.

Asadi was a member of the three-member team who received a gold medal at the world championships in Uzbekistan 2010.

Asadi is an international referee and the referee in Iran in international fields . she attends in international seminars all over the world and could improve her Technical level. She has judged in the world universiade olympic as the first and only Iranian referee woman on behalf of the world taekwondo federation in Napoli Italy 2019.

Asadi had been invited in the World Taekwondo International Referee Selection & Training Camp for 2020 Tokyo Olympic Games, was held at the World Taekwondo Wuxi Center in Wuxi, China from 18 to 21 April 2019.

A documentary about Asadi was shown on Documentary channel in 2018, directed by Vahid Kazemi, This documentary was about Iranian women who have been succeeded as wives, mothers in social activists.

Personal life
Aasadi was born on 3 November 1966. She is second child of family from Ghaemshahr, Mazandaran.

she was a young child who was confronted with the tumult of the revolution. she spent her adolescence and youth with the bitter experiences of the war between Iran and Iraq. she got married in 1980 and has got two children.

After the end of the war between Iran and Iraq in 1989, she turned to Kyokushin karate then was entered the sport of Taekwondo in 1993. Following that, as a national coach and referee she started her first official activity in Mehr Club, associate to Tehran Municipality.

When the sport of Taekwondo in the women's section crossed the Iran border, Asadi was invited to the Iranian women's national taekwondo team in October 2006.

After two years of camps and competitions without sending out, Finally in the first appearance of the women's team in the World Championships in Turkey 2008 she received the first Iranian women's individual silver medal in this event.

After ten years of membership in the national team and receiving various championship titles, today she is one of the best referees in the country in the international field and one of the best coaches in the country.

She is also the investor and managing director of the famous Meraj team, with strong presence in foreign events, the national league.

Asadi is the official instructor of the Federation Education Committee in the field of refereeing and coaching. she also teaches at the Taekwondo University of the Islamic Republic of Iran, which is the second taekwondo university in the world.

Coaching 

Asadi was the head coach of the deaf national team in 2016 for the World Taekwondo Championships and also she was the head coach of the World Deaf Olympics in 2017.

Assistant Master Kang in the first Asian Poomsae Championship 2010 Uzbekistan .

Head coach of the Taekwondo University of Applied Sciences and technology team .

More than a decade as the head coach of the Tehran team .

Managing director and head coach of Meraj Team, who could bring many champions to the Iranian championship and national team .
She was chosen as the best coach in 2018 as well.

Honors
 Second Class International Coach
 Instructor of the Taekwondo Federation Education Committee in the coaching department, refereeing, Hanmadang .
 Head coach of the Deaf national team in 2016
 head coach of the World Deaf Olympics in 2017 .
 First Class National Coach
 Specialty coach Hanmadang
 Head coach of Taekwondo University team
 Head coach of Meraj team 
 Head coach of Tehran team

Referee 

After many years of judging in Iran, Asadi was entered the field of international refereeing in 2010, the most important of them were her first appearance as an Iranian woman in the Asian Championships in Manila Philippines 2016 and the first judge Iranian woman In the Olympic 2019 World Students Championship in Napoli, Italy and the first Iranian female referee in the World Universiade Olympics competitions in Naples, Italy 2019. 
The only woman who was invited in the WT International Referee Selection & Training Camp for 2020 Tokyo Olympic Games, was held at the World Taekwondo Wuxi Center in Wuxi, China from 18 to 21 April 2019

Titles have been earned in the field of refereeing
Best referee in the Kim yong Cup tournament in South Korea
Best referee in the European International Tournament hosted by the Netherlands
International referee Kyurogi
International referee poomsae 
The best referee in the refresh course of Poomsae International referee Course in 2017
Poomsae referee instructor
Kyurogi referee instructor
Hanmadang referee instructor
First Class National referee

International activities
Asadi attends in many seminars and events hosted by different countries to improve the technical level and increase knowledge.

International Master course in South Korea

International referee Kyurogi and Poomsae Seminar in Montenegro, Malaysia, Belgium, Croatia, Sweden .

Judging in international competitions in many countries around the world, Germany, United Kingdom Netherlands, Belgium, France, Italy, Croatia, Sweden, Denmark, Poland, the Philippines, South Korea and Spain.

Sports honors 

Asadi is the holder of 6 international Don from Kukkiwon the World Taekwondo Headquarters and the 6th national Don of Iran.
She has attended in the Taekwondo national League, national championships, and member of the Iranian national taekwondo team for a decade as well .

"The most important titles was received" 
World Champion in the World Championships 2010 Uzbekistan
Second place in the World Championships 2009 Egypt
Silver medal in the World Championships 2008 Turkey
Fifth place in the World Championships 2011 Russia
Fifth place in the World Championships 2012 Colombia
Top referee in the Netherlands 2019
The best referee in South Korea 2018
The best referee in the refresh course of Poomsae International referee Course in 2017
The best coach in national taekwondo league 2018
The Shemiranat Taekwondo Vice President in Tehran
The North East Taekwondo Vice President in Tehran 
Vice President of Tehran Municipality Sports Organization of Taekwondo Association 
President of Payame Noor University Taekwondo Association
Women's representative of the coaching committee of the Iran Taekwondo Federation
Vice President of Poomsae Committee of Tehran

The first

Asadi has been recorded as the first female Iranian athlete in several fields .

Asadi received the first world individual silver medal at the first appearance of the women's team in the World Championships hosted by Turkey 2008.

Asadi is the first Iranian female referee who judges in the World Universiade Olympics competitions Napoli, Italy 2019.

Asadi is the first Iranian female referee in the Asian Championship.

Asadi as the only Iranian female referee in the World Taekwondo International Referee Selection and Training Camp for 2020 Tokyo Olympic Games.

Asadi is the first and only Iranian female managing director in the international events and the national league.

References

External links
 badri asadi in YouTube
 

Living people
1966 births
Arbitration
Iranian athletes
World Taekwondo
World Taekwondo Championships medalists
Iranian female taekwondo practitioners
Sportspeople from Mazandaran province